Siliculidae is a taxonomic family of small deepwater saltwater clams, marine bivalve molluscs, in the order Nuculanida.

Genera and species
Genera and species in the family Siliculidae include:
 Propeleda
 Propeleda fortiana
 Propeleda lanceta
 Propeleda longicaudata
 Propeleda schmidti
 Silicula
 Silicula filatovae
 Silicula fragilis
 Silicula rouchi

References
 

 
Bivalve families